Anybody Wanna Buy a Heart? is the second studio album by American R&B recording artist K. Michelle. It was released on December 9, 2014, by Atlantic Records.

Background
Following the release of her debut album Rebellious Soul and her departure from the VH1's reality hit shows Love & Hip Hop: Atlanta and Love & Hip Hop, Pate revealed that she is getting her own show, titled K. Michelle: My Life, while she's working on the album's lead single for her second album, titled "Love Em All". The trailer for her second album was released, along with the album cover artwork, which revealed few hours later. Upon the album's release, she performed the single "Hard to Do" at the 2015 BET Awards.

Singles
"Love 'Em All" was released as the album's lead single on September 16, 2014. The album's second single "Maybe I Should Call" was released on November 3, 2014, and also it was made available on iTunes, when the album was pre-ordered. The album's fourth single "Hard to Do" was later released on May 18, 2015.

Other songs
The song "How Do You Know?" was unlocked on iTunes, along with the song "Going Under". The music video for "Something About the Night" was released.

Critical response

Upon its release, Anybody Wanna Buy a Heart? received positive reviews. The Washington Post called it "a great album", stating that K. Michelle "continues to distinguish herself from her reality television peers, who seem to stay in the studio but never release music — let alone good music." Billboard deemed it one of 2014's best R&B albums, writing, "There's a serrated ferocity to K. Michelle that sends her songs past saccharine territory and into compelling unstable territory."

Complex rated the album 3.5 stars out of 5: "...[W]hile it may have taken her longer than she’d like to make this known, it cannot be denied any longer: K. Michelle is leaps and bounds ahead of many of her peers." Rolling Stone listed AWBAH as one of the top 20 R&B albums of 2014. The Philadelphia Inquirer gave AWBAH 3.5 of our four stars, writing, "...[t]his powerhouse tenor vocalist, pianist, and songwriter also is capable of great tenderness, nuance, and understatement."

Commercial performance
On December 27, 2014 the album debuted at number six on the Billboard 200, with 87,000 album equivalent units (over 84,000 in sales) in the first week in the United States. Billboard ranked the album as the best-selling R&B album of 2014. Although, it debuted lower than her previous album Rebellious Soul (2013), on its debut week outsold her previous album, became the highest debut from a R&B album in 2014.

Track listing

Notes
 signifies a vocal producer
 signifies a co-producer
 signifies an additional producer

Sampling credits
"Going Under" samples elements of "The Message", written by Clifton Chase, Edward Fletcher, Melvin Glover and Sylvia Robinson.
"Hard to Do" samples elements of "Kissin' You", written by Brian James, Janice Johnson, Julian Jackson, Maurice Simmonds and Raphael Saadiq.

Charts

Weekly charts

Year-end charts

References

2014 albums
K. Michelle albums
Atlantic Records albums
Albums produced by Eric Hudson
Albums produced by Jerry Duplessis
Albums produced by J.U.S.T.I.C.E. League
Albums produced by Oak Felder